Maa Ma Ching Marma is a Bandarban district politician from Bangladesh who was a member of parliament in a seat reserved for women.

Early life 
Marma was born in Bandarban district.

Career 
Marma is the district BNP president in Bandarban. She was a member of parliament nominated by the Bangladesh Nationalist Party from 30 women's seats in the Fifth and Sixth National Assemblies.

Marma was defeated by Bir Bahadur Ushai Singh in the 8th National Assembly elections of 2001 and the 9th National Assembly elections of 2008.

References 

6th Jatiya Sangsad members
5th Jatiya Sangsad members
Bangladesh Nationalist Party politicians
Year of birth missing (living people)
Living people
Marma people
Bangladeshi Buddhists
People from Bandarban District